The 1925–26 Washington State Cougars men's basketball team represented Washington State College for the  college basketball season. Led by eighteenth-year head coach Fred Bohler, the Cougars were members of the Pacific Coast Conference and played their home games on campus in Pullman, Washington.

This was Bohler's final season as head coach, but he continued on for years as athletic director at Washington State. Karl Schlademan, previously at the University of Kansas, was the track and field coach for the Cougars until 1940, and also the head basketball coach for his first two years in Pullman (1926–28).

References

External links
Sports Reference – Washington State Cougars: 1925–26 basketball season

Washington State Cougars men's basketball seasons
Washington State Cougars
Washington State
Washington State